Mirjana Joković (born 24 November 1967) is a Serbian film and stage actress,  best known for her role as Natalija Zovkov in Emir Kusturica's Underground (1995).  She currently is Director of Performance for Acting and an acting teacher in the Theater Faculty of the California Institute of the Arts near Los Angeles.

Early Career in Yugoslavia

Mirjana Jokovic was born in Belgrade, SFR Yugoslavia. She spent her early years in Zambia, where her father was an industrial engineer. She graduated from the Academy of Dramatic Arts in Belgrade and began to perform at the National Theater and the Yugoslav Drama Theater in Belgrade and in films and television. She made her acting debut in the drama series Put na jug (Southbound). She was a regular character in the popular Yugoslav television series "Grey Home", and in 1988 she was named Best Leading Actress at the Rio de Janeiro Film Festival and Best International Actress at the San Sebastian Film Festival in Spain.

In 1989, she starred with Daniel Day Lewis in the Argentine-British film "Eversmile, New Jersey" directed by Carlos Sorin and won best actress for the role at the San Sebastián International Film Festival. in 1991 she played the lead in the German film , then she moved to the United States, though she continued to make films in Europe. She starred in "Vukovar" (1994) which earned her the Yugoslav Best Actress Award. In 1995 she played the female lead in the film "Underground", directed by Emir Kusturica, which won the Palme d'Or  for best film at the Cannes Film Festival in 1995  and the New York Critics Circle Award for best foreign film. She also made  Three Summer Days (1997), for which she received another Yugoslav Best Actress Award, and Cabaret Balkan, which won a Special Venice Film Festival Award in 1999.

Career in the American theater and film
Her career in the United States began in theater, as she appeared in the off-Broadway production of "Mud, River Stone" by Lynn Nottage at the Playwrights Horizon Theater.   She also appeared in the chorus and as Chrysothemis in the Broadway production of Electra  directed by David Leveaux.

From 1999 through 2001 she worked at the American Repertory Theater in Cambridge, Massachusetts.   Her roles at ART included Dulle Griet in "Full Circle" by Chuck Mee,  Hermione in Shakespeare's "The Winter's Tale", Desdemona in "Othello",  the part of Natasha/Olga Knipper in "Three Farces and a Funeral" by Robert Brustein, and "Mother Courage and Her Children" by Bertolt Brecht.

In 2003 she played in "Romeo and Juliet", directed by Emily Mann, at the McCarter Theater and made the film "A Better Way to Die" directed by Scott Wiper for HBO. She also starred Off-Broadway in "Necessary Targets" by Eve Ensler,  Electra by Sophocles  at the Hartford Stage,  and Three Sisters by Anton Chekhov  at the American Conservatory Theater in San Francisco.

After her starring role in "Underground", she appeared in several European and American films. She played the part of Elena Iscovescu in "Side Streets", in 1998; the part of Adrijana, in "Strsljen" (also known as The Hornet, Le frelon, and Grenxa) in 1998;  the part of Ana in Bure baruta (also known as Cabaret Balkan, The Powder Keg, and Baril de poudre) in 1998; the part of a hotel maid in "Maid in Manhattan" in 2002;  and as Tess in "Private Property" in 2002.

In 2005 she began to teach in the Theater Faculty at the California Institute of the Arts in Valencia.

In April 2010 she helped to organize the first theater workshop via Internet between CalArts and the Moscow Art Theater School in Moscow, under the auspices of the Binational Presidential Commission created by President Barack Obama and Russian President Dmitri Medvedev. In June 2010 she was invited to come to Moscow by the U.S. Embassy as the first  Binational Presidential Commission cultural envoy to stimulate new exchanges with Moscow theaters and theater schools.

In 2019 she starred in the Canadian film Easy Land.

References

External links

 Home page of the California Institute of the Arts, faculty biographies
 Complete list of films with Mirjana Joković
 1999 interview with Mirjana Joković in Combustible Celluloid

1967 births
Living people
Actresses from Belgrade
21st-century Serbian actresses
Golden Arena winners
University of Belgrade Faculty of Dramatic Arts alumni
Serbian film actresses
Serbian stage actresses
Serbian child actresses
Yugoslav child actresses